Arthur Box (18 September 1884 – 7 June 1960) was an English footballer who played as a goalkeeper. He made more than 100 appearances in the Football League playing for Burslem Port Vale, Stoke and Birmingham. He also played for Croydon Common and Crewe Alexandra.

Career

Early career
Box was born in Hanley, Staffordshire, the son of Thomas, a boilermaker, and Edna. He was on the books at Hanley Villa, Northwood Mission and Stoke (without making a first team appearance), before joining Burslem Port Vale in August 1904.

Burslem Port Vale
He played three Second Division games in the 1904–05 season, but was mainly a back-up to Harry Cotton. He became the club's first choice goalkeeper in the 1905–06 season, playing 35 league games to George Boote's three. Unusually for a goalkeeper he actually scored a goal, albeit a penalty, in a 1–0 win over Manchester United at the Athletic Ground on 24 March 1906. In the 1906–07 campaign, he played only 12 matches, as new signing Howard Matthews was preferred. Box returned to Stoke in July 1907, with Vale in the midst of financial meltdown.

Stoke
His rivals at the Victoria Ground were Wales international Leigh Richmond Roose and the inexperienced Fred Rathbone. Box played in 39 of the club's 44 fixtures in 1907–08, as the "Potters" finished in 10th position in the Second Division. However, heavy financial problems saw the club enter liquidation and leave the Football League at the end of the 1907–08 season.

Birmingham
He joined Birmingham in September 1909 for a fee of £100, and took over first-team duties from Jack Dorrington at the end of the 1908–09 season. However, the team finished bottom of the Second Division and Box left St Andrew's at the end of the 1909–10 season.

Later career
He then moved into non-League football with Leek Victoria, Croydon Common, for whom he played 21 games in the Southern League as well as 29 in the South-Eastern League and 11 in the London League, and Crewe Alexandra.

Career statistics
Source:

References

1884 births
1960 deaths
Sportspeople from Hanley, Staffordshire
English footballers
Association football goalkeepers
Stoke City F.C. players
Port Vale F.C. players
Birmingham City F.C. players
Croydon Common F.C. players
Crewe Alexandra F.C. players
English Football League players
Southern Football League players